Westringia eremicola, commonly known as slender westringia or slender western rosemary,  is a flowering plant in the family Lamiaceae and is endemic to eastern Australia. It is a small shrub, with narrow leaves and pink, mauve to white flowers.

Description

Taxonomy and naming
Westringia eremicola  was first formally described in 1834 based on plant material collected by Allan Cunningham and the description was published in Labiatarum Genera et Species. The specific epithet (eremicola) means "lonely".

Distribution and habitat
Slender westringia grows in mallee on sandy soils in Queensland, South Australia, Victoria and New South Wales. Associated species include Calytrix tetragona, as well as  Acacia, Daviesia, Leptospermum, Leucopogon and Triodia species.

References

eremicola
Flora of New South Wales
Flora of South Australia
Flora of Victoria (Australia)
Flora of Queensland
Taxa named by George Bentham
Plants described in 1834
Lamiales of Australia